Enes Tepecik (born 11 March 2004) is an Austrian footballer currently playing as a midfielder for Rapid Wien II.

International career
Born in Austria, Tepecik is of Turkish descent. He is a youth international for Austria.

Career statistics

Club

Notes

References

2004 births
Living people
Austrian footballers
Austria youth international footballers
Austrian people of Turkish descent
Association football midfielders
2. Liga (Austria) players
SC Wiener Neustadt players
SK Rapid Wien players